Stankowski is a surname. Notable people with the surname include:

Paul Stankowski (born 1969), American golfer
Anton Stankowski (1906–1998), German graphic designer, photographer, and painter
Albert Stankowski (born 1971), Polish historian

See also
Stanowski